Tony Sargisson (born 24 June 1975 in Hastings, New Zealand) won the silver medal for New Zealand in the men's 50km walk at the 2006 Melbourne Commonwealth Games. He now lives in Auckland and walks for Racewalking Auckland.

References

Living people
1975 births
New Zealand male racewalkers
Commonwealth Games silver medallists for New Zealand
Athletes (track and field) at the 1998 Commonwealth Games
Athletes (track and field) at the 2002 Commonwealth Games
Athletes (track and field) at the 2006 Commonwealth Games
Sportspeople from Hastings, New Zealand
Commonwealth Games medallists in athletics
Medallists at the 2006 Commonwealth Games